Salem Historic District is a national historic district located at Salem, Harrison County, West Virginia.  The district encompasses 28 contributing buildings in the central business district developed after a devastating fire in 1902.  The district is almost exclusively commercial, with the exception of a few residences.  Notable buildings include the B & O Railroad Station (1912), Cozy Corner (c. 1902), Salem Baptist Church (c. 1913), First National Bank (c. 1902), U.S. Post Office (c. 1941), Brissey Insurance Building (c. 1902), Wilson Building (c. 1902), and the Queen Anne style Pearcy-Randolph House (c. 1900), former home of Senator Jennings Randolph.

It was listed on the National Register of Historic Places in 1980.

References

National Register of Historic Places in Harrison County, West Virginia
Historic districts in Harrison County, West Virginia
Commercial buildings on the National Register of Historic Places in West Virginia
Queen Anne architecture in West Virginia
Romanesque Revival architecture in West Virginia
Historic districts on the National Register of Historic Places in West Virginia